Neolioceratoides is genus of ammonites that lived during the Pliensbachian and Toarcian stages of early Jurassic. It has been considered to be a synonym of Lioceratoides, but cladistic analysis has shown, that this genus is not only valid, but they even belong to different subfamily, as Lioceratoides belongs to Harpoceratinae. Their fossils were found in Europe and northern Africa.

Description
Ammonites belonging to this genus have evolute, moderately compressed shells. Whorl section is subtrapezoidal to subrectangular. Ventrum is tricarinate, but furrows are not very deep. Ribs are present even on living chamber and have sigmoidal shape. It differs from Lioceratoides by being more evolute and having thicker whorl section. Ribs are also are more regularly arranged.

References

Ammonitida genera
Hildoceratidae
Pliensbachian life
Toarcian life
Early Jurassic ammonites of Europe
Ammonites of Africa
Ammonite genera